Lewis Wood Physioc (June 30, 1879 – January 16, 1972) was a cinematographer, matte artist, and painter in the United States. After his film career he taught film at USC in Los Angeles. He was the older brother of Wray Physioc.

Physioc wrote about film technique. He was affiliated with the American Society of Cinematographers.

Filmography

Rolling Stones (film) (1916)
The Kiss (1916 film)
A Coney Island Princess (1916) by Edward Sheldon starring Irene Fenwick and Owen Moore
The Long Trail (film) (1917)
Bab's Burglar (1917)
Seven Keys to Baldpate (1917 film) starring George M. Cohan and Anna Q. Nilsson with cinematography by Ned Van Buren and Physioc
A Girl Like That (1917)
The Antics of Ann (1917)
Bab's Diary (1917) starring Marguerite Clark
The Claw (1918)
Upstairs and Down (1919) starring Olive Thomas, David Butler, and Robert Ellis (actor, born 1892)
The Glorious Lady (1919)
 The Spite Bride (1919)
 The No-Gun Man (1924)
 The Millionaire Cowboy (1924)
Western Limited (1932) starring Estelle Taylor, Edmund Burns, and Lucien Prival
Midnight Patrol
The Beast of Borneo (1934)

References

American cinematographers
1879 births
1972 deaths
American painters
University of Southern California faculty